= Kikongo (spider) =

Scientific classification
- Kingdom: Animalia
- Phylum: Arthropoda
- Subphylum: Chelicerata
- Class: Arachnida
- Order: Araneae
- Infraorder: Araneomorphae
- Family: Gnaphosidae
- Genus: Kikongo; Rodrigues & Rheims, 2020

Type species
- K. ruwenzori Rodrigues & Rheims, 2020

Species
- Kikongo buta Rodrigues & Rheims, 2020; Kikongo rutshuru Rodrigues & Rheims, 2020; Kikongo ruwenzori Rodrigues & Rheims, 2020

Genus of spiders

Kikongo is a genus of sub-Saharan African ground spiders first described by B. V. B. Rodrigues and C. A. Rheims in 2020. As of December 2021 it contains only three species: K. buta, K. rutshuru, and K. ruwenzori.
